The Eight Views of Korea are a collection of the beautiful scenery of Korea, that are known today and that have been defined in the past.

They were defined after the Eight Views of Xiaoxiang of the Song Dynasty of China.

General
The Eight Views of Korea are a collection of the beautiful scenery of Korea, that are now understood to be as follows: 

 Mount Kumgang (금강산, 金剛山)
 Hallasan (한라산, 漢拏山)
 Seokguram (석굴암, 石窟庵)
 Haeundae (해운대, 海雲臺)
 Pujon Highland (부전고원, 赴戰高原)
 Pyongyang (평양, 平壤) 
 Baekdu Mountain (백두산, 白頭山)
 Yalu River (압록강, 鴨緑江)

These Eight Views were sung in a popular song called "the Song of the Eight Views of Korea".

See also
 Eight Views of Danyang
 Eight Views of Pyongyang

References

Arts in Korea
Geography of Korea
Tourist attractions in North Korea
Tourist attractions in South Korea